Kathryn Newcomer is an American Political Scientist, author and professor of public policy and public administration. She was previously the director of the George Washington University's Trachtenberg School of Public Policy and Public Administration.

Early life and education 
Newcomer graduated with a B.A. in education and an M.A. in political sciences from the University of Kansas. Subsequently, she obtained a PhD from the University of Iowa. While in Kansas, Newcomer served on the University Senate Libraries Committee.

Career 
Newcomer started her career as Visiting Assistant Professor at the University of Denver. Subsequently, she served as an assistant professor at the University of Nebraska and then joined George Washington University as Professor and Chair of the Department of Public Administration.

Works 
Newcomer has authored and co-authored different books and various publications.

Among her notable works are:

 The Handbook of Practical Program Evaluation (1994)
 Meeting the Challenges of Performance-Oriented Government (2002)
 Getting Results: A Guide for Federal Leaders and Managers (2005)
 Transformational Leadership: Leading Change in Public and Nonprofit Agencies (2008)

Newcomer also serves on the Editorial Board of The American Review of Public Administration.

Additional affiliations 
Newcomer is a member of the National Academy of Public Administration since 1996, and currently serves on the Controller General's Education Advisory Panel.

From 2006 to 2007, Newcomer served as President of the Network of Schools of Public Policy, Affairs and Administration (NASPAA).

From 2008 to 2014, Newcomer served on the Advisory Committee on Business and Operations of the National Science Foundation and since 2008, served on six committees of the National Academy of Sciences. She also served as a member of the board of the American Evaluation Association (AEA) from 2012 to 2015. In 2017, she became President of AEA.

Awards and recognitions 
Newcomer has received different awards and recognitions, including:

 The Elmer Staats Award for Achievements in Government Accountability by the American Society for Public Administration (2008)
 The Duncombe Excellence in Doctoral Education Award by NASPAA (2016)

She has also received different awards from the George Washington University, including the Peter Vaill Award for Excellence in Education (1995) and the Oscar and Shoshanna Trachtenberg Prize for Service (2014).

Personal life 
Newcomer is based in Washington, D.C.

References 

George Washington University faculty
American women political scientists
American political scientists
Living people
University of Iowa alumni
University of Denver faculty
Year of birth missing (living people)
University of Kansas alumni